Arlette Alcock (born Arlette Christine Aida Brabant, 8 October 1958) is a Métis-Canadian folk musician, songwriter and social activist.
Arlette is best known for performing her outspoken songs which detail the past and current challenges facing Metis and Aboriginal Canadians.
 Since 1997 she has released two full-length albums of original music under the mononym Arlette. Both albums have received extensive Aboriginal Radio airplay in Canada and the United States. Arlette has been nominated for a variety of Aboriginal music awards in North America and won the Songwriter of the Year award at the Native-E Music Awards in Albuquerque, New Mexico, in 2008.

Career 

Arlette began writing poetry and playing guitar when she was a teenager, building a reputation as a songwriter. Her writing focuses on her Indigenous heritage, spirituality, racism and residential school abuse.

Her debut album Tribe of One  was released in 1997. Her second album, Wolfgirl was produced by Grammy Award Nominee Gaye Delorme
 and released in 2007. Both albums received airplay on Aboriginal Radio stations in Canada and the United States, as well as the CBC National Radio in Canada.

In 2008 Arlette won the Songwriter of the Year award at the Native-E Music Awards, 
 in Albuquerque, New Mexico. She was nominated for Best Folk Recording at the Native American Music Awards the same year, and her single "Her Suitcase" was an Honor Award Finalist for acoustic folk single in the 2008 Great American Song Contest.

Arlette has been featured on the Aboriginal Peoples Television Network show Beyond Words, is a member of the National Aboriginal Recording Industry Association and has collaborated with many other notable Métis Canadian musicians including Cheryl l'Hirondelle,
Sandy Scofield, and Janet Panic.

Personal life 

Arlette Alcock was born in Trail, British Columbia on 8 October 1958 to Roseline Chartrand, of the Pine Creek First Nation of Manitoba and Raymond Adam Brabant, of the Little Black Bear First Nation of Saskatchewan.
 
Arlette is a Métis descendant of Pine Creek Saulteaux  Anishinaabe, and Irish lineage on her mother's side, together with Little Black Bear Cree and French ancestry on her father's side.
Her parents were both Canadian residential school survivors.

In addition to her career as a musician, Arlette has also worked as a library technician for the Federation of Saskatchewan Indian Nations,  
the Union of BC Indian Chiefs, and the First Nations University in Prince Albert, Saskatchewan.

Arlette is a vocal advocate for many social justice issues in Canada

including missing and murdered Indigenous women (MMIW), the protection of women's reproductive rights and people living with addictions in Vancouver's Downtown Eastside, where her mother died 1988. Her mother's story is referenced in the lyrics of her song Roseline.

Discography

References

External links 
www.arlettemusic.com

1958 births
Living people
Métis musicians
Canadian women singer-songwriters
Canadian singer-songwriters
Canadian folk guitarists
Canadian women folk guitarists
People from Trail, British Columbia
Canadian women activists
First Nations activists